The Bachelle Automobile company was an electric automobile company from Chicago, Illinois.

History
In fall of 1900, a man named Otto von Bachelle (a noted electrical engineer) made his first electric car. It was a small, compact car, and was only produced in small numbers. It did not survive after 1904. von Bachelle was last heard from in 1915. The cars could travel  on one charge. Otto later became consulting engineer at Hupmobile.

References

Electric vehicles introduced in the 20th century
Manufacturing companies based in Chicago
Motor vehicle manufacturers based in Illinois
Defunct motor vehicle manufacturers of the United States
Electric vehicle manufacturers of the United States
1900s cars
1910s cars
Veteran vehicles
Vehicle manufacturing companies established in 1900
Defunct companies based in Chicago